The Taxi Dancer is a 1927 American silent comedy film directed by Harry F. Millarde and starring Joan Crawford and Owen Moore. 

This was the first film in which Joan Crawford received top billing.

Plot
Joselyn Poe is a southern girl who tries her luck as dancer in New York City.  When she is unable to find work, she works as taxi dancer and meets several suitors throughout the story.

Cast
Joan Crawford as Joslyn Poe
Owen Moore as Lee Rogers
Marc McDermott as Henry Brierhalter
Gertrude Astor as Kitty Lane
Rockliffe Fellowes as Stephen Bates
Douglas Gilmore as James Kelvin
William Orlamond as 'Doc' Ganz
Claire McDowell as Aunt Mary
Bert Roach as Charlie Cook
Lou Costello as Extra (uncredited)

Crew
 David Townsend (art director) - Set Designer

References

External links

Still and lobby cards at joancrawfordbest.com
Stills at silenthollywood.com

1927 films
1927 comedy films
Silent American comedy films
American silent feature films
American black-and-white films
Metro-Goldwyn-Mayer films
Films directed by Harry F. Millarde
1920s American films